Comet Tavern is a restaurant on Seattle's Capitol Hill, in the U.S. state of Washington.

Description 
The bar has been described as a "grunge institution", a "smoky" dive, and a "rocker's hangout".

History 
David Meinert has been a co-owner.

Reception 
Alexa Peters included the bar in Thrillist's 2019 list of "The Best Bars for Single Mingling in Seattle".

See also 

 List of dive bars

References

External links
 
 

Capitol Hill, Seattle
Dive bars in Washington (state)
Restaurants in Seattle